Mount Sabyinyo ("Sabyinyo" is derived from the Kinyarwanda word "Iryinyo", meaning "tooth"; also "Sabyinyo, Sabyinio") is an extinct volcano in eastern Africa in the Virunga Mountains. Mount Sabyinyo is the oldest volcano of the range. It is north-east of Lake Kivu, one of the African Great Lakes, and west of Lake Bunyonyi in Uganda. It also is within the adjoining national parks established by these countries: Virunga National Park in the DRC, the Volcanoes National Park in Rwanda, and Mgahinga Gorilla National Park in Uganda.

The slopes of Mt. Sabyinyo are a habitat for the critically endangered mountain gorilla. The mountain carries the local nickname "Old Man's Teeth," because its serrated summit resembles worn teeth in a gum line (in contrast to the perfect conical summits of the adjacent mountains in this range).

References

External links

  Encyclopædia Britannica entry
  National Geographic photo

Mount Sabyinyo
International mountains of Africa
Volcanoes of Africa
Mountains of Rwanda
Mountains of Uganda
Mountains of the Democratic Republic of the Congo
Stratovolcanoes of Rwanda
Stratovolcanoes of Uganda
Stratovolcanoes of the Democratic Republic of the Congo
Three-thousanders
Border tripoints
Mount Sabyinyo
Mount Sabyinyo
Mount Sabyinyo
Mount Sabyinyo
Extinct volcanoes
Pleistocene stratovolcanoes
Mount Sabyinyo